The Tennis Stadium Rochusclub is a tennis complex located in Düsseldorf in Germany. The stadium had hosted the ATP World Team Cup before it was canceled and a new event the Power Horse Cup was created hosting this event since 2013.

Tennis venues in Germany
Sports venues in North Rhine-Westphalia
Buildings and structures in Düsseldorf